Bebe Phạm (born Phạm Thị Thúy; April 3, 1983 in Bien Hoa, Vietnam) is a Vietnamese model and actress. She became interested in modeling at the age of 17 and by the age of 19 she started her modeling ambitions at informal gatherings of would-be models near her home, where she learned the basics of modeling.

That same year she traveled to Ho Chi Minh City where she started working for LYDAC, a French modeling agency with offices all around the world. 
After the closure of LYDAC, Bebe was already in possession of the credentials needed to work for Vietnam's top modeling agency, PL Agency, and later that year she won the prestigious "Supermodel Vietnam 2005" award.

Bebe has been since then photographed for numerous international print ad campaigns for many high-level brands such as Reebok, Caravan Hotel, Rémy Martin or Fashion TV. Pham also appeared in the 2007 Nautical Angels Underwater calendar, a collection of underwater photos by filmmaker and photographer Michael Gleissner.

She splits her time between Singapore, Los Angeles and Cebu, Philippines, where she is frequently involved with shooting movies for Bigfoot Entertainment.

Pham holds an accounting degree from Lac Hong University in Vietnam and runs a furniture import business in addition to her modeling and acting work.

Personal life 

In 2011, she married Vietnamese actor Dustin Nguyen of 21 Jump Street fame. They have two daughters Sky (born 2013) and Scarlett (born 2015).

Filmography

As an actress, Bebe Pham has starred in the following movies:
 Midnight Movie as Roxanne (USA, 2007)
 Deep Gold Lead Actress, (Philippines 2007)
 Irreversi as Fashion Show Model (Hong Kong, 2008)
 Victim of Circumstance Lead Actress, (Vietnam-USA 2009)
 Hui Lu as Fashion Show Model (China, 2009)
 The Girl with No Number, as Phuong Ly (USA, 2012)

References

External links 
Bebe Pham's official home page
Bebe Pham's Fan page
Bebe Pham portfolio on iStudio.com

Vietnamese film actresses
Vietnamese female models
1983 births
Living people
People from Bien Hoa
21st-century Vietnamese women